William L. Havili (born 9 September 1998) is a New Zealand rugby union player, of Tongan heritage, who plays for  in the Bunnings NPC and Moana Pasifika in Super Rugby. His position is First five-eighth. He is the brother of All Blacks player David Havili.

Career 
He was named in the Tasman Mako squad as a development player for the 2021 Bunnings NPC. He made his return to the side in Round 4 of the competition, coming off the bench against  at Trafalgar Park. Havili signed with Moana Pasifika for the 2022 Super Rugby Pacific season.

Having become a regular starter for Moana Pasifika throughout 2022, Havili was called up to play test rugby for Tonga ahead of their World Cup qualifiers.

Personal life
Havili was eligible for two nations, New Zealand through birth and Tonga through ancestry.

References

External links
 

1998 births
Living people
Moana Pasifika players
New Zealand rugby union players
People educated at Nelson College
Rugby union fly-halves
Rugby union players from Motueka
Tasman rugby union players
Tonga international rugby union players
Tongan rugby union players